Haus Party, Pt. 3 is the fifth extended play by American singer-songwriter, actor, and YouTube personality Todrick Hall. It was released on February 12, 2021, and serves as the final part of the Haus Party trilogy.

Release and promotion
In a May 2019 interview with Billboard magazine, Hall said the EP was "probably going to come out at the beginning of September". However the date was pushed back multiple times to October 30, 2019 November 27, 2019, February 14, 2020, May 1, 2020, May 13, 2020, June 19, 2020 and Valentine's Week 2021.

The EP was made available for pre-order with the lead single "Blue" on October 10, 2019, exclusively on iTunes  The second single, "Pink Dreams", was released on January 10, 2020. The EP was removed from Apple Music in early 2020, but Hall announced in a YouTube video in January 2021 that the EP would finally be released on February 12, 2021, albeit with a different track list than originally announced.

Track listing

References

2021 EPs
Todrick Hall albums